"It Won't Be Long" is a 1963 song by The Beatles.

It Won't Be Long may also refer to:
 "It Won't Be Long" (Alison Moyet song) (1991)
 "It Won't Be Long," a song by Elvis Presley from the soundtrack album Double Trouble.

See also
 "Won't Be Long", a 2007 song by the Hives from The Black and White Album